Acousticity, released in 1993, was the first album in a new, stripped down format by the long-running folk rock outfit the Albion Band. It combines the song writing talents of the band members with traditional tunes and music from some of the best folk artists available at the time. It marked the beginning of a new lease of life for the long running and highly influential Albion Band, shaping the small group format that would be the basis of their line-up until their suspension in 2002.

History
Band leader and folk legend Ashley Hutchings pre-empted the unplugged trend of the 1990s by reducing the numbers and instruments of his long running collective the Albion Band by bringing back longtime collaborator and fellow ex-Fairport Convention founder Simon Nicol, beside new talent: singer-songwriter and guitarist Chris While and energetic fiddler Ashley Reed. After touring in Britain and Canada with the new line-up, the band retired to the Astra Studios in Ashford, Kent to record some songs that were part of their live set and some newly rehearsed material. Live performances of this set were released as Acousticity on Tour (Talking Elephant, 2004).

Reception and Significance
The album was well received in the folk and roots press of the time and has been singled out by Ashley Hutchings as one of the proudest achievements in his long career.

Track listing
 Flandyke Shore (3:35)
 The Foresters / Nicol's Real Ale Polka / The Travellers / The Seven Stones (5:16)
 Sister Moon (4:13)
 We Lie (5:04)
 Head-Smashed-In-Buffalo-Jump (3:46)
 Head-Smashed-In Reel (1:45)
 Black Jack, Blue John & Galena / Blue John Hornpipe (3:22)
 Bitter-Sweet Bed (2:53)
 Fastnet Rock / Man of War (6:02)
 Carolan's Cap / Sir Festus Burke (3:02)
 Dancer to the Drum (4:41)
 Fiddle on the Washboard (6:10)

Credits
 Track 1 Trad. arr. Nic Jones, Ashley Hutchings, Chris While
 Tracks 2a/c, 9a, 12 Ashley Reed
 Track 2b The Seven Stones
 Track 3 Chris While, Joe While
 Tracks 4, 5 Chris While, Ashley Hutchings
 Track 6 Ashley Reed, Simon Nicol, Chris While
 Track 7a Ashley Hutchings, Ashley Reed
 Track 7b Trad. arr. Ashley Reed, Chris While, Simon Nicol, Ashley Hutchings
 Track 8 Cyril Tawney
 Track 9b Steve Knightley
 Track 10 Turlough O'Carolan arr. Ashley Reed, Simon Nicol
 Track 11 Beth Nielsen Chapman

Production
 Recorded at Astra Studios, Monks Horton, Ashford, Kent
 Engineered by Dave Woolgar & Paul Godfrey
 Produced by Simon Nicol
 Cover and sleeve design by Malcolm (Really Wicked Productions
 Cover photos by Clive Taylor
 Back photo by Mick Sherlock

Personnel
 Ashley Hutchings, acoustic bass guitar, vocals;
 Simon Nicol, acoustic guitar, vocals;
 Ashley Reed, violin, vocals;
 Chris While, vocals, acoustic guitar;
 Diane Walmisley guests on vocals on Memories of You

References

1993 albums
The Albion Band albums